The Battle of Poljana (Monday May 14 – Tuesday May 15, 1945) was a battle of World War II in Yugoslavia. It started outside of Poljana, near the village of Prevalje in Yugoslavia (now Slovenia), and was the culmination of a series of engagements between the Yugoslav Army and a large retreating Axis column, numbering in excess of 30,000 men. The column consisted of units of the German (Wehrmacht), the Armed Forces of the Independent State of Croatia, the Montenegrin People's Army (former Chetniks and the survivors of the Battle of Lijevče Field), and Slovene Home Guard forces, as well as other fascist collaborationist factions and even civilians who were attempting to escape into British-controlled Austria. It took place after Nazi Germany officially surrendered on May 8.

Background 
In November 1944 the Independent State of Croatia (NDH) reorganized its armed forces to combine the units of the Ustaše and of the Army of the Independent State of Croatia into 18 divisions, comprising 13 infantry, two mountain divisions, two assault divisions, and one replacement division, each with its own organic artillery and other support units. There were also several armoured units. From early 1945 the divisions were allocated to various German Corps, and by March 1945 they were holding the  Southern Front.

In the spring of 1945 the  German Army and their allies were in full retreat from the Yugoslav Army. In early April the Yugoslav 3rd Army, under the command of Kosta Nađ, fanned out through the Drava Valley, reaching a point north of Zagreb, and crossed the old Austrian–Yugoslav border in the Dravograd sector. The 3rd Army closed the ring around Axis forces when its advanced motorized detachments linked up with detachments of the 4th Army in  Carinthia. This action prevented the German Army Group E from escaping northwest across the Drava River. Completely surrounded, General Alexander Löhr, Commander-in-Chief of Army Group E was forced to sign the unconditional surrender of the forces under his command at Topolšica, near Velenje in Slovenia, on Wednesday May 9. Nevertheless, some of his troops, along with collaborationist units, namely the  Croatian Armed Forces, the Slovene Home Guard, the Montenegrin People's Army (former Chetniks), and elements of other factions, continued to resist and tried to fight their way west to seek the protection of the British forces at Klagenfurt (in present-day Austria).

Battle
Just before 9 am on May 14, a significant force of mostly Croatian Armed Forces units and Slovenian Home Guard troops approached Yugoslav Army positions at the Šurnik farm near Poljana demanding free passage west. This was refused, and firing commenced on both sides. Croatian Armed Forces attacks, including artillery fire support, intensified in the afternoon, evening, and night. 

The end-of-war situation was chaotic, with individuals and small groups separating from the main column and seeking to make their own way over the hills to Austria. Large numbers of skirmishes took place.

In this highly charged situation, Strle records a meeting at a castle in Austrian Carinthia on the evening of May 14 of the British, the Yugoslav Army, represented by Ivan Kovačič (nom de guerre: Efenka), Ivan Dolničar (nom de guerre: Janošek), political commissar of the 14th Strike Brigade, and Viktor Cvelbar, commander of the Zidanšek Brigade, and four or five Ustaše generals, including Ivo Herenčić and Mirko Gregurić. At the meeting, the Ustaše demanded free passage for their forces across the Drava River to the protection of the British. The Yugoslav delegation argued successfully that they were the long-standing allies of the British and that the British should not flirt with enemy forces, but should cooperate in curtailing them. It was also argued that the Ustaše and others were guilty of crimes against the people and should be responsible for them. 

According to Strle, by agreement between the Yugoslav Army and the British, an ultimatum was given to the Ustaše at the meeting that surrender to the Yugoslav Army was the only option, and that British tanks would be deployed to block the only open route of escape to the west. 

The main battle ended on the morning of May 15 with the arrival of around 20 British tanks. Tense negotiations followed, during which British officers made it abundantly clear that they would not offer protection to the collaborators and that unconditional surrender to the Yugoslav Army was the only option. White flags of surrender were finally raised around 4 pm on May 15.

Casualty estimates by the Yugoslav Army were at least 310 Croatian Armed Forces and Axis dead in the two main locations of fighting, and 250 wounded. On the Yugoslav Army side, losses were considerably lower, numbering fewer than 100 dead and wounded.

The surrender of this last area of Axis resistance occurred 8 days after the official end of World War II in Europe, which was the surrender of the Germans on Monday, May 7, 1945. On May 15, the Bleiburg repatriations began.

See also
 Seven anti-Partisan offensives

References
Notes

Bibliography
 Thomas, N., Mikulan, K. and Pavelic, D. Axis Forces in Yugoslavia 1941-45, Osprey, London, 1995.

External links
 Franci Strle: Veliki Finale na Koroškem (Grand Finale in Carinthia) (2nd edition, 1977) (in Slovene)
 extract from Franci Strle: Veliki Finale na Koroškem (Grand Finale in Carinthia) (2nd edition, 1977) (in Slovene)

Conflicts in 1945
Yugoslavia in World War II
Battles of World War II involving Chetniks
Battles involving the Yugoslav Partisans
Battles involving the Independent State of Croatia
Battles of World War II involving Germany
1945 in Slovenia
Slovenia in World War II
Slovene Partisans
1945 in Yugoslavia
May 1945 events